Nicola Mancino (born 8 March 1984) is an Italian football player. He plays for Francavilla.

Club career
He made his Serie B debut for Napoli in the 2002–03 season.

On 17 September 2019 he signed with Serie D club Francavilla.

References

External links
 

1984 births
Footballers from Naples
Living people
Italian footballers
S.S.C. Napoli players
Latina Calcio 1932 players
S.S. Teramo Calcio players
Ternana Calcio players
S.S.C. Giugliano players
S.S.D. Lucchese 1905 players
A.S. Martina Franca 1947 players
Calcio Foggia 1920 players
U.S. Siracusa players
F.C. Grosseto S.S.D. players
Casertana F.C. players
S.S. Ischia Isolaverde players
Rimini F.C. 1912 players
S.S. Fidelis Andria 1928 players
F.C. Francavilla players
Serie B players
Serie C players
Serie D players
Association football midfielders